The deputy president of the Republic of Kenya (Swahili: Naibu Rais wa Jamhuri ya Kenya) is the principal assistant of the President of the Republic of Kenya.

History 
Prior to the 2010 Constitution of Kenya, the deputy president was known as the Vice-President, and the President had the power to appoint and dismiss the Vice-President at will. 

In order to remove the repeated abuse of this privilege, the new Constitution promulgated in 2010 mandated that the person nominated as the running mate of a candidate for the presidency during the elections becomes the Deputy President-elect upon their candidate being declared the winner of the presidential elections. In addition to this change in appointing responsibility, unlike in the previous Constitution where the Vice President usually held a secondary role of being a Cabinet Minister, the new Constitution mandates that the Deputy President is not permitted to hold any other state or public office and shall only perform the duties assigned to the office by the Constitution and by the President.

Since the country's independence, there has been one vacancy in the office, from 8 January 1998 until 3 April 1999. Three of Kenya's Vice/Deputy Presidents, Mwai Kibaki, Daniel Moi and William Ruto have gone on to serve as President, with the latter currently serving as the incumbent President since 13 September 2022. Prior to this,  he served as acting president for a few days after president Uhuru Kenyatta temporarily transferred his powers and office to appear before the International Criminal Court.

Qualifications and Election to Office 
The 2010 Constitution states that for a person to become the Deputy President, the person must be nominated as the running mate of a candidate in the presidential elections and the person must themselves qualify to be nominated as a candidate for election as President.

Upon a person being nominated as a running mate and their candidate wins the elections, the Independent Electoral and Boundaries Commission then declares that the candidate is the President-elect, and the running mate is subsequently the Deputy President-elect.

The Deputy President-elect takes office on the same day as the President-elect and serves from the date sworn in until:

 The next President-elect is sworn in.
 Upon assuming the office of the President; or
 Resignation, death or being removed from office under the conditions provided by the Constitution

Responsibilities 
The following is a summary of the responsibilities of the Deputy President as provided in the Constitution:

 Serves as the President's principal assistant and deputises for the President in the performance of the responsibilities of the President.
 The Deputy President acts as the President if the sitting President is absent, temporarily incapacitated or whenever the President assigns this responsibility; and
 Performing any other responsibility assigned by the Constitution and the President.

List

Parties

Key
 Died in office

See also 
 Kenya
 President of Kenya
 Prime Minister of Kenya
 List of colonial governors and administrators of Kenya
 Lists of office-holders

References 

Kenya
Kenya
Vice-presidents

1964 establishments in Kenya